William Beardmore and Company was a British engineering and shipbuilding conglomerate based in Glasgow and the surrounding Clydeside area. It was active from 1886 to the mid-1930s and at its peak employed about 40,000 people. It was founded and owned by William Beardmore, later Lord Invernairn, after whom the Beardmore Glacier was named.

History

Forged steel castings, armour plate and naval guns
The Parkhead Forge, in the east end of Glasgow, became the core of the company. It was established by Reoch Brothers & Co in 1837 and was later acquired by Robert Napier in 1841 to make forgings and iron plates for his new shipyard in Govan. Napier was given the contract to build , sister ship to the Royal Navy's first true ironclad warship, . Parkead was contracted to make the armour for her, but failed, so the manager, William Rigby called in William Beardmore Snr, who at the time was superintendent of the General Steam Navigation Company in Deptford, to help. Beardmore became a partner in the business and, moving to Glasgow was joined by his brother Isaac and son, William Jr. On the premature death of William Snr, Isaac retired and William Jnr became sole partner. He founded William Beardmore and Company in 1886. By this time they had begun the manufacture of steel armour plate and later diversified into the manufacture of heavy naval guns, such as the BL 9.2 inch gun Mk IX–X and BL 15 inch Mk I naval gun.

Shipbuilding

In 1900, Beardmore took over the shipyard of Robert Napier and Sons in Govan, a logical diversification from the company's core steel forgings business. In 1900, Beardmore also began construction of what would become The Naval Construction Yard, at Dalmuir in west Clydebank; the largest and most advanced shipyard in the United Kingdom at the time.  was the yard's first order to complete, in 1906. This work was facilitated by the construction of the Arrol Gantry, a large steel framework supporting nine high-speed electric cranes. Beardmore eventually sold the company's Govan shipyard to Harland and Wolff in 1912. In 1917 Beardmore completed the aircraft carrier , the first carrier to have a full-length flight deck. Beardmore expanded the activities at Dalmuir to include the manufacture of all sorts or arms and armaments, the site employing 13,000 people at its peak.

The post war recession hit the firm hard, and the shipyard was forced to close in 1930. Part of the site and some of the existing buildings later became incorporated into ROF Dalmuir, part was used by the General Post Office for their cable-laying ships.

Merchant ships
Beardmore also built oil tankers, including:
British Commerce,   British Tanker Company, (1922)
British Enterprise,   British Tanker Company, (1921)
British Merchant,   British Tanker Company, (1922)
British Trader,   British Tanker Company, (1921)

Railway locomotives
An attempt was made during the 1920s to diversify into the manufacture of railway locomotives at Dalmuir. Twenty 4-6-0 tender locomotives were built for the Great Eastern Railway as part of their class S69. Ninety London and North Western Railway Prince of Wales class locomotives were built between 1921 and 1922, along with an extra exhibition locomotive for the LNWR's successor, the London, Midland and Scottish Railway in 1924. They also built 90 ‘Jinty’ tank engine for the LMS between 1928 and 1929. Beardmore's locomotive production was small compared with the established competition.

In concert with US and Canadian Westinghouse, diesel engines were developed and installed for railway self-propelled car use.  Canadian National Railways had two articulated cars powered with Beardmore 320 hp engines, eight cars with 185 hp engines, and seven cars with 300 hp engines.  Canadian National also purchased two locomotives, 9000-9001, built by Westinghouse and fitted with 1,330 hp engines. Several American railroads had self-propelled cars fitted with Westinghouse engines derived from Beardmore designs.

Aviation

The company first became involved in aviation in 1913, when it acquired British manufacturing rights for Austro-Daimler aero-engines <ref>Austro-Daimlers in England[[Flight International|Flight]], 1 November 1913</ref> and later those for D.F.W. aircraft.

It later built Sopwith Pup aircraft at Dalmuir under licence. Later, a shipborne version of the Pup, the Beardmore W.B.III, was designed by the company. A hundred of these aircraft were produced and delivered to the Royal Naval Air Service (RNAS). Beardmore also built 50 of the Nieuport 12 under licence, incorporating many of their own refinements however production was delayed sufficiently that by the time they entered service the aircraft were obsolete and were primarily relegated to training duties or placed into storage and never used.

The company built and ran the Inchinnan Airship Constructional Station at Inchinnan in Renfrewshire. It produced the airships R27, R32, R34 and R36.

In 1924, the company acquired a licence for stressed skin construction using the Rohrbach principles. An order for two flying boats using this construction idea was placed with Beardmore. It had the first aircraft built for it by the Rohrbach Metal Aeroplane Company in Copenhagen, building the second itself and they were delivered to the RAF as the Beardmore Inverness. In addition, a large, experimental, all-metal trimotor transport aircraft was designed and built at Dalmuir and delivered to the Royal Air Force as the Beardmore Inflexible. Beardmore produced a line of aircraft engines, including the Cyclone, Meteor, Simoon, Tornado (used in the R101 airship), Typhoon and Whirlwind.

Aircraft

Own designs
Beardmore W.B.1
Beardmore W.B.1a
Beardmore W.B.II
Beardmore W.B.III (most successful design)
Beardmore W.B.IV
Beardmore W.B.V
Beardmore W.B.VI
Beardmore W.B.XXIV Wee Bee
Beardmore W.B.XXVI

Licensed designs
Beardmore Inflexible (Rohrbach)
Beardmore Inverness (Rohrbach Ro IV)
Handley Page V/1500
Nieuport 12
Royal Aircraft Factory B.E.2C
Sopwith Camel
Sopwith Pup
Wight Seaplane

Aircraft engine
Beardmore Adriatic engine

Airships
R24r
R27
R32 (airship)
R34 (airship)
R36 (airship)

Road vehicles

In 1917, Beardmore bought Sentinel Waggon Works, a manufacturer of steam-powered railway locomotives, railcars and road vehicles. In 1919 a range of cars was announced, to be made by a subsidiary company, Beardmore Motors Ltd, based in factories in Glasgow and the surrounding area; Anniesland, Coatbridge and Paisley.

Cars and taxis
After the Great War, Beardmore manufactured cars and London-type taxis  under their own name. The first car was the 1486cc, four-cylinder 11.4, which had a 4-cylinder overhead camshaft (OHC) engine. It was manufactured at Anniesland, Glasgow and introduced at Olympia in 1919. The shaft drive to the camshaft proved to be unreliable and it was replaced by a chain. The engine was increased in capacity to 1854 cc and the car, renamed as the 12/30 was introduced in June 1923. This new engine was used, in 1923 in the new Super Sports. It was priced at £750 and each car came with a certificate that guaranteed that it had been driven around Brooklands track at 70 mph (110 km/h). A highly modified version of the Super Sports, with a 2-litre engine broke the course record at the Shelsley Walsh hill climb in 1924.

The Anniesland factory was closed by 1925 and car production was moved to the taxi factory at Paisley, where a new model, the 14.40, with a sidevalve engine of 2297 cc with an aluminium cylinder head was introduced. The engine was increased to 2391 cc in 1925 and the car redesignated the 16.40. Two standard bodies were offered, the Stewart saloon and the Lomond limousine. A large car, the four cylinder 4072 cc Thirty was made at Coatbridge in 1920 but it was unsuccessful and was discontinued.

Production of the Beardmore Taxi began at Paisley in 1919 with what became known retrospectively as the Mk1. This was designed to meet the Metropolitan Police Conditions of Fitness for London Taxis. It was a very tough and reliable vehicle and it earned itself the name of 'The Rolls-Royce of taxicabs'. A car version, the Country and Colonial model was also made, as was a light van. It was replaced in 1923 by the Mk2, which had an all-new chassis, which it shared with a new range of light trucks and buses. Following a change in the Conditions of Fitness, Beardmore introduced a new model, the Mk3 'Hyper'. This had a smaller, 2-litre sidevalve engine and was lighter and more economical to run.

Following the removal of William Beardmore from the board of his company in 1929, Beardmore Motors was bought out by its directors, and taxi production was moved from Scotland to Hendon, North London. Here in 1932 a new model, the Mk4 Paramount was introduced, which was essentially an updated Mk3 with a 2-litre Commer engine and gearbox. In 1935, the Mk5 Paramount Ace, with a new, longer wheelbase chassis was introduced, with the same engine. It was followed in 1938 by the Mk6 Ace, which had detail refinements. The 1930s Beardmore became known as the 'greengrocer's barrow', because 'all the best things were in front'!

After the Second World War, Beardmore Motors sold and serviced the new Nuffield Oxford cab, until the newly formed British Motor Corporation axed it in favour of their own Austin FX3. Beardmore Motors then returned to making their own cabs. The model they introduced, in 1954 was the Mk7 Paramount, which had a traditional style coachbuilt body, of aluminium panels over an ash frame, built by Windover. The engine was from a Mk1 Ford Consul, (later, a Mk2 Consul and finally a Ford Zephyr 4) but a Perkins 4.99 diesel was offered from 1956. In the same year, body production was taken over by Weymann at Addlestone. Production of the entire cab was soon moved there. In 1966, when Metropolitan-Cammell bought Weymann, taxi production was moved to MCW's factory at Washwood Heath, Birmingham, where it ended in late 1966. Final production of the Mk7 amounted to just over 650 cabs.

Motorcycles

Between 1921 and 1924 Beardmore took over building the Precision range of motorcycles that had been developed by Frank Baker, selling them as "Beardmore Precision". Engine sizes ranged from 250 cc to 600 cc. They also supplied the engines to several cyclecar manufacturers. After Beardmore stopped manufacture, Baker set up his own company again and restarted production.

Diesel engines
Although heavy oil engines had been built from the early years of the century for power-generation purposes, a range of automotive diesels was under development at the time of the financial crisis; the Bank of England commissioned consulting engineer Harry Ricardo to assess these and he gave a mostly favourable report,  the largest customer for the Dalmuir-built Beardmore Engine was Glasgow Corporation who took 30 6-cylinder 90 bhp engines in Albion Venturer M81 chassis during 1934, but reliability was so poor that by five years later all had been replaced by Leyland 8.6 litre units.

Decline and demise
Beardmore's various companies became unprofitable in the post-WW1 slump, resulting in the company facing bankruptcy. Financial aid initially came from Vickers Limited, which took a 60 per cent stake in Beardmores, before pulling out in the late 1920s. Beardmore himself was removed from executive control of his company by the Bank of England. Most of Beardmore's various businesses were wound down over the next few years until Beardmore's retirement and death in 1936, although some persisted.

Dalmuir Shipyard
The crisis in the British shipbuilding industry after the First World War resulted in the formation of a company with the purpose of taking control of and eliminating loss-making shipyards to reduce capacity and competition; National Shipbuilders Securities Ltd, under Sir James Lithgow of shipbuilding giant Lithgows, Limited. The former bought Beardmore's Dalmuir yard in 1930 and the yard was closed and its facilities dismantled, although various maritime engineering works persisted on the site until 1936. The Dalmuir site was re-established as ROF Dalmuir in 1939 however and was later sold to Babcock & Wilcox in 1957 to supplement their main factory in Renfrew during a peak in power station building in the 1960s, who continued to operate there until returning all manufacturing to their Renfrew Works in 1969. During the 1970s the site was converted into the Clydebank Industrial Estate and in recent years has also formed the location of the Golden Jubilee Hospital and the Beardmore Hotel.

Parkhead Forge
Sir James Lithgow purchased Beardmore debentures from the Bank of England on favourable terms in 1934, taking control of Beardmore's iron and steel assets including – the former centrepiece of the Beardmore empire – the Parkhead Forge. It was at Parkhead Forge that James spotted young engineering manager Ian MacGregor who broke a strike by driving a crane himself for two weeks. James accelerated his career and MacGregor went on himself to be a major industrial figure.

After Parkhead Forge was nationalised by the Iron and Steel Corporation of Great Britain between 1951 and 1954, it was acquired by Sheffield-based Firth Brown Steels in 1957, before the Forge was finally closed in 1983, with Firth Brown consolidating its operations in Sheffield. The land later became The Forge Shopping Centre, which opened in 1988.

Archives
The archives of William Beardmore and Company are maintained by the  Archives of the University of Glasgow (GUAS).

See also
 Beardmore Precision Motorcycles
Arthur MacManus and David Kirkwood, notable Scottish socialists and trade unionists active in the Beardmore workforce.
Timeline of hydrogen technologies

Notes

Bibliography

May, C.A.N.  Shelsey Walsh'' G T Foulis.

Further reading

External links

Beardmore Diesel-Electric Train
Beardmore Precision motorcycle
Clyde-built ships database
The Jaimes Caird Society
 

Beardmore
Beardmore
Beardmore
Beardmore
 
Beardmore
Former defence companies of the United Kingdom
Beardmore
Beardmore
Beardmore
Beardmore
Beardmore
Beardmore
Beardmore
Beardmore
Beardmore
Beardmore
Beardmore
Beardmore
Beardmore
River Clyde
Parkhead
Beardmore
British companies established in 1886
Engine manufacturers of the United Kingdom
British companies disestablished in 1987